Ennio Antonelli (23 February 1927 - 6 August 2004) was an Italian actor and former boxer. He appeared in more than one hundred films from 1961 to 1991.

Filmography

References

External links 

1927 births
2004 deaths
Italian male film actors
20th-century Italian male actors
Burials at the Cimitero Flaminio